The 2017–18 FIBA Europe Cup was the third season of the FIBA Europe Cup, a European professional basketball competition for clubs that was launched by FIBA. The competition began on 20 September 2017, with the qualifying rounds, and concluded with the second leg of the final on 2 May 2018. Umana Reyer Venezia won its first European competition, after defeating Sidigas Scandone in the all-Italian Finals.

Format changes
For the 2017–18 season, the FIBA Europe Cup was reduced to 32 teams in the regular season. This included eight groups of four teams divided into two conferences and the two top teams from each regular season group would advance to the second round of four groups of four teams followed by the two-legged play-offs. 19 out of 22 teams were dropped from Champions League qualifying rounds while 10 teams come (with additional 3 lucky losers team) from the qualifying rounds that were implemented.

Eligibility of players
FIBA agreed to adopt eligibility rules, forcing the clubs to have at least 5 home-grown players in rosters of 11 or 12 players, or at least four if the team has got less players.

Team allocation
A total of 60 teams are expected to participate in the 2017–18 FIBA Europe Cup.

Teams
The labels in the parentheses show how each team qualified for the place of its starting round. 
 1st, 2nd, 3rd, 4th, 5th, etc.: League position after eventual Playoffs
 CL: Transferred from Champions League
 RS: Fifth-placed and sixth-placed teams from regular season
 QR: Losers from qualifying rounds

Round and draw dates
The schedule of the competition is as follows (all draws are held at the FIBA headquarters in Munich, Germany, unless stated otherwise):

Qualifying rounds
The draw for the qualifying rounds was held on 3 August 2017 at the FIBA headquarters in Munich, Germany.

In the qualifying rounds, teams are divided into seeded and unseeded teams based on their club coefficients, and then drawn into two-legged home-and-away ties. Teams from the same country cannot be drawn against each other.

First qualifying round
A total of 20 teams played in the first qualifying round. The first legs were played on 19–21 and 24 September, and the second legs were played on 26–28 September 2017.

Second qualifying round
A total of 20 teams played in the second qualifying round: 10 teams which enter in this round, and the 10 winners of the first qualifying round. The first legs were played on 3 and 4 October, and the second legs were played on 10 and 11 October 2017.

Lucky losers table
Three teams would advance as lucky losers of the qualifying rounds, for replacing teams dropped from the Champions League that refused to join the competition. The three teams with the smallest point difference in the second qualifying round advanced to the regular season.

Regular season

The draw for the regular season was held on 3 August 2017 at the FIBA headquarters in Munich, Germany.

The 32 teams are drawn into eight groups of four, with the restriction that teams from the same country cannot be drawn against each other. In each group, teams play against each other home-and-away in a round-robin format. The group winners and runners-up advance to the second round, while the third-placed teams and fourth-placed teams are eliminated.

A total of 32 teams play in the regular season: the ten winners of the play-off round, the 19 of 24 losers of the 2017–18 Champions League qualifying rounds and the three lucky losers who replaced the defeated teams that used their opt-out clause.

FIBA has provided information on the situation of teams who signed a clause that allows them to withdraw from the FIBA Europe Cup if they are eliminated in the 2017–18 Basketball Champions League qualifying rounds. In other words, the following nine teams ended their continental adventure when they were eliminated from the main continental competition organized under the aegis of FIBA and therefore refuse to participate in the FIBA Europe Cup:

Opt-out clause teams
  Kalev/Cramo
  Nanterre 92
  MHP Riesen Ludwigsburg
  Juventus
  Vytautas
  Divina Seguros Joventut
  Movistar Estudiantes
  Luleå
  Budivelnyk

Depending on the number of teams mentioned above that were eliminated from the Basketball Champions League qualifying rounds and with the aim to complete the 32 places in the regular season, the number of the defeated teams in the second qualifying round of the FIBA Europe Cup that advanced to the regular season were determined by the point difference recorded at the end of their pairings. In their draw, the first qualifying round was used for tie-breaking. In the draw persists, the next criterion was the performance of clubs in the last three seasons at the European competitions.

Finally, the best three losing teams have qualified for the group stage:
Qualified lucky losers
  Bnei Herzliya 
  Khimik
  Balkan

The three lucky losers were be drawn into Groups D, F and G by FIBA Europe on 12 October in the House of Basketball in Mies, Switzerland.

The match-days were on 18 October, 25 October, 1 November, 8 November, 15 November and 6 December 2017.

Group A

Group B

Group C

Group D

Group E

Group F

Group G

Group H

Second round
In each group, teams play against each other home-and-away in a round-robin format. The group winners and runners-up advance to the round of 16, while the third-placed teams and fourth-placed teams are eliminated.

A total of 16 teams play in the second round: the eight group winners and the eight runners-up of the regular season. The match-days will be on 20 December 2017, 10 January, 17 January, 24 January, 31 January and 7 February 2018.

Group I

Group J

Group K

Group L

Ranking of third-placed teams

Play-offs

In the play-offs, teams play against each other over two legs on a home-and-away basis. The playoff round starts with 16 teams, where second round group winners and runners-up are joined by eight more teams transferring from the Basketball Champions League. The draw was made without any restriction. Movistar Estudiantes, Élan Chalon, AEK Athens and SIG Strasbourg, had opt-out clauses from playing in the FIBA Europe Cup and in the event of them claiming fifth or sixth place, their spot would be filled by the best-ranked third-placed teams from the second round.

Bracket

Round of 16
The first legs were played on 6–7 March, and the second legs on 13–14 March 2018.

Quarter-finals
The first legs were played on 20–21 March, and the second legs on 27–28 March 2018.

Semi-finals
The first legs will be played on 11 April, and the second legs will be played on 18 April 2018.

Finals

The first leg will be played on 25 April, and the second leg will be played on 2 May 2018.

Individual honours

Top Performer
After each gameday a selection of five players with the highest efficiency ratings is made by the FIBA Europe Cup. Afterwards, the official website decides which player is crowned Top Performer of the round.

Regular season

Second round

Round of 16

Quarterfinals

Semifinals

See also
 2017–18 EuroLeague
 2017–18 EuroCup Basketball
 2017–18 Basketball Champions League

References

External links

 FIBA Europe Cup (official website)
 FIBA (official website)

 
FIBA Europe Cup